Symphyotrichum potosinum (formerly Aster potosinus) is a species of flowering plant in the family Asteraceae native to Mexico and the U.S. state of Arizona.

Description

Symphyotrichum potosinum is a perennial, herbaceous plant which blooms June to September. It has from one to three hairless or mostly hairless stems arising from the root base in an ascending or erect fashion. The stems are green but sometimes purple or purplish-brown. Although hairless or nearly so, the stems do have a small amount of hair at the axils where the leaves meet the stems.

Leaves
The leaves are thin and grass-like, hairless or nearly so. By the time the plant flowers, the basal leaves are usually withered, yet the stem leaves usually remain.

Flowers

The inflorescences of S. potosinum consist of a usual range of  flower heads in paniculiform arrays with their branches growing at  angles to the stem.

There are usually  yellow disk florets with triangular spreading lobes when they bloom.

Chromosomes
Symphyotrichum potosinum has a base number of five chromosomes  with a diploid count of 10.

Taxonomy

History and classification

The basionym (original scientific name) of Symphyotrichum potosinum is Aster potosinus . Its name with author citations is Symphyotrichum potosinum . The species was formally described in 1880 by American botanist Asa Gray from a specimen collected by E.Palmer and C.C.Parry, now the holotype and housed in the Gray Herbarium. It is a member of the genus Symphyotrichum classified in the subgenus Astropolium.

Etymology
The word Symphyotrichum has as its root the Greek symphysis, which means "junction", and trichos, which means "hair". The specific epithet potosinum is a Latinization of the Spanish word  for the Mexican state of San Luis Potosí where the holotype was found.

The species' former genus, Aster, comes from the Ancient Greek word  (astḗr), meaning "star", referring to the shape of the flower. An old common name for Astereae species using the suffix "-wort" is "starwort", also spelled "star-wort" or "star wort".

Distribution and habitat

Santa Rita Mountain aster is native to Arizona and Mexico. , it is known in the United States only from Cochise County, Arizona. In Mexico, it has a recorded presence in the states of Aguascalientes, Chihuahua, Durango, Guanajuato, Guerrero, Hidalgo, Jalisco, México, Michoacan, Oaxaca, Puebla, San Luis Potosí, Sonora, Veracruz, and Zacatecas.

Conservation
NatureServe lists Symphyotrichum potosinum as Imperiled (G2) worldwide, and Critically Imperiled (S1) in Arizona. The species is extirpated from the Santa Rita Mountains and possibly the Chiricahua Mountains. It is threatened by road maintenance, recreation, and habitat and water supply destruction. The species' status in Mexico is not given.

Notes

Citations

References

 
 

 
 
 
 
 
 
 
 

 

potosinum
Flora of Arizona
Flora of Mexico
Plants described in 1880
Taxa named by Asa Gray